The Salzach (Austrian: [ˈsaltsax]) is a river in Austria and Germany. Its drainage basin of  comprises large parts of the Northern Limestone and Central Eastern Alps. 83% of its drainage basin lies in Austria, the remainder in Germany (Bavaria). Its largest tributaries are Lammer, Berchtesgadener Ache, Saalach, Sur and Götzinger Achen.

Etymology

The river's name is derived from the German word Salz "salt" and Aach. Until the 19th century, shipping of salt down the Salzach was an important part of the local economy. The shipping ended when the parallel Salzburg-Tyrol Railway line replaced the old transport system.

Course
The Salzach is the main river in the Austrian state of Salzburg. The source is located on the edge of the Kitzbühel Alps near Krimml in the western Pinzgau region.

From here, it runs eastwards through a large valley via Bruck south of Lake Zell to Schwarzach im Pongau. It then turns northwards and passes Sankt Johann im Pongau. North of here, the Salzach forms the narrow Salzachöfen Gorge between the Berchtesgaden Alps and the Tennen Mountains and then flows to Hallein and the city of Salzburg. 

From the junction with its Saalach tributary in the northern Salzburg basin, the Salzach forms the border between Bavaria, Germany and the Austrian states of Salzburg and Upper Austria for almost . Cities on the banks in this lower section include Laufen and its sister town Oberndorf bei Salzburg, Tittmoning, and Burghausen. All these towns have border crossings.

The river finally joins the Inn in Haiming between Burghausen and Braunau.

Tributaries 

Hydroelectric power plants 
Currently, there are 12 hydroelectric power plants on the Salzach. The power plants are listed beginning at the headwaters:

Photos

See also
Salza (Austria)

Sources 

 Österreichisches Bundesministerium für Land- und Forstwirtschaft, Umwelt und Wasserwirtschaft: Die Salzach - ein Fluss bewegt! (PDF, 7,94 MB)
 Norbert Winding und Dieter Vogel (Hrsg.): Die Salzach. Wildfluss in der Kulturlandschaft. Verlag Kiebitz Buch, Vilsbiburg 2003,

References

Austria–Germany border
International rivers of Europe
Rivers of Upper Austria
Rivers of Bavaria
Altötting (district)
Traunstein (district)
Berchtesgadener Land
Rivers of Salzburg (state)
 
Rivers of Austria
Rivers of Germany
Border rivers